Hadena clara is a species of moth of the family Noctuidae. It is found in Morocco, southern Europe, Turkey, Armenia, Azerbaijan, the Caucasus region, Israel, Lebanon, Syria and Iran.

Description
Warren states E. clara Stgr. Forewing ochreous whitish, dusted with dark; the lines fairly distinct; the stigmata obscure; hindwing ochreous white, the termen tinged with fuscous. Turkestan; — ab. celebrata Alph. [now Dichagyris celebrata ] is a dark form with the markings plainer, while ab. verecunda Pung. (7e) [now Dichagyris verecunda] is altogether paler and marked only by two dark costal spots.

Subspecies
Hadena clara macedonica (Macedonia)
Hadena clara gladys (northern Iran)
Hadena clara weissi (Caucasus)
Hadena clara alpina (France)
Hadena clara dujardini (France)
Hadena clara nevadensis (Spain)
Hadena clara atlantis (Morocco)

Biology
Adults are on wing from May to June. There is one generation per year.

The larvae probably feed on capsules of Caryophyllaceae species.

Reference

External links
 Hadeninae of Israel

Hadena
Moths of Europe
Moths of Asia
Moths of Africa
Moths described in 1901